Walter William Buchanan Topping (1908–26 July 1978) was a unionist politician in Northern Ireland.

Topping studied at the Rossall School and Queen's University Belfast, before becoming a barrister in 1930.  During World War II, he served as a Lieutenant-Colonel in the Royal Artillery.  He was elected to the Parliament of Northern Ireland in 1945 as the Ulster Unionist Party member for Larne, serving as Parliamentary Secretary to the Ministry of Finance - effectively the Chief Whip - from 1947 until 1956, then as the Minister of Home Affairs.  He resigned in 1959 to become the Recorder of Belfast, serving until 1978. In 1967, he became a member of the Privy Council of Northern Ireland.

References

1908 births
1978 deaths
Alumni of Queen's University Belfast
Members of the House of Commons of Northern Ireland 1938–1945
Members of the House of Commons of Northern Ireland 1945–1949
Members of the House of Commons of Northern Ireland 1949–1953
Members of the House of Commons of Northern Ireland 1953–1958
Members of the House of Commons of Northern Ireland 1958–1962
Northern Ireland junior government ministers (Parliament of Northern Ireland)
Northern Ireland Cabinet ministers (Parliament of Northern Ireland)
Members of the Privy Council of Northern Ireland
Barristers from Northern Ireland
People educated at Rossall School
Ulster Unionist Party members of the House of Commons of Northern Ireland
Recorders of Belfast
Members of the House of Commons of Northern Ireland for County Antrim constituencies
British Army personnel of World War II
Royal Artillery officers